Guanare is the capital and most populated city of Portuguesa State, Venezuela. It is where la Virgen de Coromoto is said to have appeared to a Coromoto Indian.

Guanare was founded on 3 November 1591 by João Fernandes de Leão Pacheco (1543–1593), a Portuguese captain from Portimão.

Located at the edge of the Southwestern floodplains, near the Andes foothills, Guanare is in a region known for livestock and agricultural production. Guanare is also the location of one of the campuses of UNELLEZ

Notable people
 Javier Bertucci, philanthropist and businessman
 Ivian Sarcos, Miss World 2011
 Martín Pérez, baseballer
 Ernesto Mejía (Baseballer)

Geography

Climate

References

 
Cities in Portuguesa (state)
Populated places established in 1591
1591 establishments in the Spanish Empire